Mihaela Cârstoi (born 24 February 1970) is a Romanian biathlete. She competed at the 1992 Winter Olympics and the 1994 Winter Olympics. She also competed in three cross-country skiing events at the 1988 Winter Olympics.

References

1970 births
Living people
Cross-country skiers at the 1988 Winter Olympics
Biathletes at the 1992 Winter Olympics
Biathletes at the 1994 Winter Olympics
Romanian female biathletes
Romanian female cross-country skiers
Olympic biathletes of Romania
Olympic cross-country skiers of Romania
Place of birth missing (living people)